Papaichton (unofficial spelling Papaïchton with a trema) is a commune in the overseas region and department of French Guiana. The village lies on the shores of the Lawa River. Papaichton is served by the Maripasoula Airport.

The village which is the seat of the commune was named Papaichton-Pompidouville in honour of the president Pompidou who invited Granman Tolinga to the Élysée in 1971. The commune is located on the border with Suriname.

Papaichton is home to some of the Aluku people and the seat of their granman (paramount chief).

History
Around 1710, Slaves escape from the plantations in Suriname, and band together in tribes. A tribe calling itself Aluku settled in Cottica over the border in Suriname. In 1760, the Ndyuka, another Maroon tribe, signed a peace treaty with the Society of Suriname allowing them autonomy. Boni also desired a peace treaty, but the Society of Suriname, despite contrary advice from the Dutch government, wanted to persecute and destroy the Aluku. Between 1768 and 1793, the Boni wars started in which the Ndyuka side with the Dutch colonists, and it resulted in many Alukus seeking refuge in France on the other side of the Maroni River.

In 1895, the village was founded by Granman Ochi. At the time, Boniville was the capital of Aluku tribe. In 1930, the territory of Inini was founded, with Papaichton as one of the administrative divisions. The territory of Inini allowed for an autonomous and self sufficient tribal system for the Maroons without clear borders. In 1946, French Guiana departmentalised, and the territory of Inini became an arrondissement.

In 1965, Granman Tolinga moved the capital of the tribe from Boniville to Papaichton. In 1968, the municipal circle of Grand-Santi-Papaichton was created, and a year later became a commune. Along with the commune, came a government structure, and francisation. Most importantly, it led to the concentration in bigger villages and the near abandonment of smaller settlements. In 1976 the communes separated in Apatou and Grand-Santi-Papaichton, and finally in 1993, Papaichton became an independent commune.

Population

Transport
Papaichton can only be accessed by air, or boat via the Maroni river. The unpaved path between Maripasoula and Papaichton will be turned into a proper road. Road work has commenced on 20 July 2020 and was scheduled to be completed by 2021. There are plans to extent the Route Nationale from Saint-Laurent-du-Maroni to Maripasoula, however the Route Nationale currently ends south of Apatou.

Incident at Loka
Loka is a hamlet in the commune of Papaichton. In April 2006, 14 people of the same family, including 12 children, were found dead, believed to be the result of carbon monoxide poisoning.

Nature

The commune is dominated by the Cottica Mountain, which rises to a height of 744 metres. The mountain was ignored by scientists until 2005 when two naturalists started investigating the area, and discovered a remarkable biodiversity.

The Lawa River narrows when it passes through the mountainous area around Cottica, and wild streams with waterfalls descend from the mountains through dense rainforest. The river widens to the north and splits in many streams with large river islands. The nature area around river is called .

Villages
 Boniville
 Cormotibo

The commune is also home to several small hamlets which have a historic significance to the Aluku people. Between 1793 and 1837, the Aluku settled in Gaan Day.

In 1860, a peace treaty was signed with the Ndyuka, and the Aluku were allowed to settle in the village of Abouna Sounga. The rapids of Abouna Sounga form the northern border of the Aluku area. The southern border is the Litani River.

L'Enfant Perdu is a village on a river island across Cottica, Suriname. The Cottica mountain is located on the French side.

Notable people 
 Apatou (1833–1908), guide and captain (village chief)

See also
Communes of French Guiana

References

External links
 Papaichton at Annuaire-mairie (in French)

Communes of French Guiana